Brooke D'Hondt (born 9 March 2005) is a Canadian snowboarder who competes internationally in the halfpipe discipline.

Career 
D'Hondt made her debut at the age of 14 at the 2020 Winter X Games, where she would finish sixth.

On January 19, 2022, D'Hondt was named to Canada's 2022 Olympic team in the halfpipe event. D'Hondt was the youngest person named to the Canadian team.

References

External links 
 

2005 births
Living people
Canadian female snowboarders
Sportspeople from Calgary
Snowboarders at the 2022 Winter Olympics
Olympic snowboarders of Canada